Leptonia has been defined as a genus of small and medium sized pink-spored mushrooms that contains over 100 species. They are saprotrophic and most grow on the ground, but some are found on wood.  The cap is thin and can be convex, plane, often depressed and usually has small scales.  The gills are widely spaced,  usually having adnexed to adnate attachment (rarely they can be a little decurrent) and the stalk is fragile.  The spores are angular and are flesh colored to pink.  Some Leptonia species have distinctive colors such as black, blue, green, yellow, and violet, but even these are difficult to identify.

Most modern taxonomic authorities do not recognize Leptonia as a genus in its own right, but only as a subgenus of Entoloma.

Although little is known about the edibility of mushrooms of this group, some are known to be poisonous. Data produced by the molecular study by Moncalvo in 2002, has species of Nolanea, Leptonia and Inocephalus interspersed with various Entoloma species in a broadly monophyletic entolomatoid group.

Species
Leptonia ambigua
Leptonia bispora
Leptonia boardinghousensis
Leptonia carnea
Leptonia foliomarginata
Leptonia newlingii – Australia
Leptonia occidentalis
Leptonia omphalinoides
Leptonia quinquecolor
Leptonia sabulosa – Australia
Leptonia subpanniculus – Australia
Leptonia substricta – Australia 
Leptonia umbraphila
Indigo Blue Leptonia

See also
List of Entolomataceae genera

References

External links
 Leptonia incana - Green leptonia

Agaricales genera
Entolomataceae